Parasol is a 2015 Belgian drama film directed by Valéry Rosier. It premiered at the 2016 San Sebastián International Film Festival. The film received seven nominations at the 7th Magritte Awards, including Best Film and Best Director for Parasol.

Cast
 Alfie Thomsone as Alfie
 Yoko Père as Pere
 Julienne Goeffers as Annie
 Christian Care as Christian
 Delphine Theodore as the receptionist
 Ahilen Saldano as Ahilen

Accolades

References

External links
 

2015 films
2015 drama films
Belgian drama films
2010s French-language films
2015 directorial debut films
French-language Belgian films